Baxter is a Canadian children's comedy television series. The series is produced by Shaftesbury Films, in association with Family Channel. The series ran from May 24, 2010 to January 2, 2011 before being cancelled later that year.

Plot 
Baxter is a half-hour live-action comedy that follows slacker student and wannabe comedian Baxter McNab and his friends at Northern Star School of the Arts.

Cast 
Evan Williams as Baxter McNab, a slacker student when he accepted into his father's old high school, his acting style is a comedy winging it and has a love for improv acting. He also has a not-so-hidden crush on the new girl to the school Tassie Symons, and may develop a relationship with his best friend Emma Ruby. The two also share the first kiss of the series in "Trust Game" during an improv show down.
Holly Deveaux as Emma Ruby, Baxter's best friend and aspiring actor who has shown an affinity towards dance, and accidental improv as shown when she and Baxter make fun of Shakespeare in "Trust Game". And she might develop feelings for Baxter and/or Devo. Devon and Emma had a moment on the episode "Dancing Fools."
Kyle Mac as Marcus Crombie, Baxter's main rival in the series. He and Baxter are polar opposites in almost every way from their attitudes to their acting styles. Marcus prefers heavily scripted works of art but has shown to be able to adapt rather quickly to new events as shown in "Cindy and the Prince of Rock".
Brittany Bristow as Tassie Symons, a new girl who came to Northern Star to help launch an acting career. Baxter has a crush on her but she likes his rival Marcus.
Shannon Kook as Devon Phillip, a street dancer who came to Northern Star because his mom felt he needed a more control when he dances. He also develop feelings for Emma, considering the episode "Dancing Fools."
Tara Joshi as Jenna Jacovitch, the star of the hit TV show "My Girlfriend Is an Alien". She takes dance and is over dramatic.
Dewshane Williams as Jackal Corman, a director in the making. He also has an affinity towards dance getting along well with Devon even making their own hit dance together, called Dance Craz-Y.

Production 
The series was commissioned by Family Channel and then produced by Shaftesbury Films. The series was created by Alex Pugsley and Daphne Ballon with Christina Jennings and Scott Garvie as executive producers. Season one aired on May 24, 2010 and finished on January 2, 2011.

Episodes

References 

2010s Canadian sitcoms
2010s Canadian high school television series
2010 Canadian television series debuts
2011 Canadian television series endings
English-language television shows
Television series by Shaftesbury Films
Family Channel (Canadian TV network) original programming
Canadian musical television series
Television series about teenagers
Television shows filmed in Toronto